Wildey Turf is a football stadium at the Sir Garfield Sobers Sports Complex, Wildey, Barbados.

It is used by the Barbados Football Association for national team and club matches.

In 2014, FIFA provided finances for an administrative building and grand stand. Artificial turf was later installed. 

The venue hosted its first senior international match, against Belize on 4 June 2018.

References

Sports venues in Barbados
Football venues in Barbados